John Smart (1 May 1741 – 1 May 1811), was an English painter of portrait miniatures. He was a contemporary of Richard Cosway, George Engleheart, William Wood and Richard Crosse.

Biography
Smart was born in Norfolk, but not much is known of his early life. It is recorded that in 1755 he was runner up to Richard Cosway in a drawing competition for under-14s held by the Society for the Encouragement of Arts, Manufactures and Commerce. In the same year he began attending the new drawing school of William Shipley in London, along with Cosway and Richard Crosse.

He exhibited at the Society of Artists, in London, from 1762 onwards; and became its president in 1778. He went to India in 1788 and obtained a number of commissions in that country. He settled down in London in 1797, latterly in Fitzroy Street, and died there in 1811.

He was a man of simple habits, and a member of the Society of Sandemanians.

Work
Smart mainly painted watercolour miniatures on ivory, and often clearly signed and dated his work. A number of his preparatory drawings and sketches survive.

His work is entirely different from that of Cosway, quiet and grey in its colouring, with the flesh tints elaborated with much subtlety and modelled in exquisite fashion. He possessed a great knowledge of anatomy, and his portraits are drawn with greater anatomical accuracy and possess more distinction than those of any miniature painter of his time.

The most important collection of Smart's work was given by John W. and Martha Jane Phillips Starr to the Nelson-Atkins Museum of Art. The Starr collection includes a signed and dated miniature for each year of Smart's career, from 1760 to 1811, enabling scholars to view the full progression of Smart's style and technique as well as the changing fashions of the period.

Many of his pencil drawings still exist in the possession of the descendants of a great friend of his only sister. Several of his miniatures are in Australia and belong to a cadet branch of the family.

Smart taught portrait painting to Isabella Beetham, who was one of Britain's finest silhouette artists in the 18th century.

Personal life
Smart married Edith Vere, and is believed to have had only one son, who died in Madras in 1809.

Gallery

References

Further reading

 GC Williamson, The History of Portrait Miniatures, vol. ii. (London, 1904).

1740 births
1811 deaths
18th-century English painters
English male painters
19th-century English painters
English portrait painters
Portrait miniaturists
Glasites
19th-century English male artists
18th-century English male artists